The North Kowloon Magistracy (北九龍裁判法院 / 北九龍裁判司署 before 1 July 1997) is a historic building and former Magistrate's Court located at No. 292, Tai Po Road, Shek Kip Mei, Kowloon, Hong Kong.

The building was erected in 1960 and served the community for over 44 years. The Magistracy used to handle cases in the Kowloon District, which covers Mong Kok, Sham Shui Po, Shek Kip Mei, Cheung Sha Wan and Ho Man Tin, and could be considered one of the busiest in Hong Kong. It was closed in 2005 due to cost saving policy of the government and consolidation of magistracies from nine to six. In February 2009, the government declared that the building will be converted into the Hong Kong campus of the Savannah College of Art and Design. It operated as the Savannah College of Art and Design (SCAD) (Hong Kong) from September 2010 until 1 June 2020. The Government took over the historic building after the expiry of the tenancy on 1 August 2020.

History

Before 1942, two magistracies were handling offences in Kowloon: one, located in Shanghai Street between Public Square Street and Market Street, was demolished in 1957. The other one was the Kowloon Magistracy in Gascoigne Road, built in 1936 and renamed the South Kowloon District Court in 1957. The North Kowloon Magistracy was built in 1960. After its completion, the building functioned as both magistrates' courts and space on the upper floors for more Government offices. During the illegal Chinese influx during the Cultural Revolution in the 1960s, if the illegal immigrants arrived the Magistracy after making their way from the border, they will be granted permanent residency on Hong Kong. It became the sole judicial court handling offences in Kowloon in 2000, when the magistracy in Gascoigne Road was closed.

The North Kowloon Magistracy was closed on 3 January 2005 due to cost saving policy of the government and consolidation of magistracies from nine to six. The estimated saving from the closure of North Kowloon Magistracy is HK$6.6 million a year coming mainly from the reduction of registry staff. Cases from this court have consequently been dealt with in Kwun Tong, Kowloon City and Sha Tin Magistrates' Courts.

Jurisdiction
The magistracy was classified as the lowest court that handled indictable and summary offences. It was made up of a Juvenile Court, four Magistrates' courts and government offices. Minor offences such as traffic conviction, littering and juvenile offences were treated in the Special Magistrates and Juvenile Court respectively. Solemn cases were usually transferred to the District Courts or the Court of First Instance. The maximum sentence in the Magistracy is two years' imprisonment and a mulct of $100,000. There were more than forty defendants attended the court daily and could reach up to eighty occasionally.

Important events
The cases adjudicated in North Kowloon Magistracy were mostly minor ones including prostitution, illegal hawking and littering in prohibited areas.

On 7 December 1998, an elderly hawker suddenly set fire to himself in the Magistracy after he was convicted of illegal hawking, fined HK$400 and had his jade trinkets confiscated. He died two days later in the hospital.

In December 2002, someone sprayed red paint on the rear door of the Magistracy to support the implementation of Article 23, he was later charged with criminal damage to property.

In December 2003  (aka King of the Gangsters) (Traditional Chinese: 季炳雄) appeared in the Magistracy facing charges of illegal possession of firearms and causing grievous bodily harm to two police officers.  Since Kwai was a mastermind of a cross-border gang and the most wanted criminal whom the Hong Kong Police Force had wished to apprehend, there were over one hundred armed police officers stationed outside the Magistracy on the trial date for security purposes.

Architecture
The 7-storey court building was built in granite ashlar blocks in 1960 and designed by Palmer & Turner Architects. North Kowloon Magistracy is featured by the Neo-classical architecture and Stripped Classicism, a form of neo-classicism from which most of the traditional mouldings, ornament and details have been elided, visually emphasizing the structural and proportional systems. Although there are a few other buildings of similar design in Hong Kong, the Magistracy building appears to be the only surviving example of this building type and therefore can be considered as a rarity.

The building is divided into 3 functional zones and characterized by independent circulation access for general public, magistrates and staff, police and prisoners respectively. Its gross floor area is approximately 7,345 m2 with a central atrium.

On its front facade, there are central projecting bay, symmetrical tall and narrow windows. Tiled apron panels can be seen. The external wall is mostly grey with blue canopies. A central light well was constructed spanning the third to the fifth floor.

Construction materials

The materials used for construction of the building is reinforced concrete.
For the exterior part, there are mainly granite finishes on the front facade, with granite sprayed as coverage. Dark blue glazed ceramic tiles were used too.
For the interior part, various materials were adopted. Emulsion paint was used on the wall with some other floor finishes, e.g. vinyl and ceramic floor tiles and timber floor strips.

Architectural merits

External

The door at the main entrance is a pair of bronze doors and the bronze doorcases with moulded architraves. Another major architectural feature of the building is the double half-turn unenclosed symmetrical grand staircase outside the door that form a hexagon. On the balustrade of staircases, there is ornamental ironwork featuring with Grecian motifs. Some landings, strings, spandrels in Italianate palazzo style can also be found.

Internal
There are ornamental handrails and guard bars to the windows, and Italianate balustrades on the staircases on the first three floors.

Defects
Minor cracks on walls and beams at some floors are found on the building. Spalling of concrete is also observed on ceilings of some floors. Regular maintenance and monitoring is required to keep the structural slabs, beams and columns in good condition.

Conservation
Since its closure in 2005, the Hong Kong Government had suggested making the North Kowloon Magistracy a declared monument or turning the Magistracy into the headquarters of the Hong Kong Examinations and Assessment Authority. However, this proposal faced strong opposition from the Sham Shui Po District Council, which in turn suggested using the site to build a Legal History Museum.

In 2008, the North Kowloon Magistracy was part of the seven buildings of Batch I of the Hong Kong Government's Revitalising Historic Buildings Through Partnership Scheme seeking adaptive reuse of government-owned historic buildings. On 17 February 2009, the government declared that the building will be used by the Savannah College of Art and Design (SCAD) (Traditional Chinese: 美國薩凡納藝術設計學院) as the school building as well as helping the old court become a Digital Media Centre of Asia.

The Savannah College of Art and Design is granted the right to use the building of the former North Kowloon Magistracy for its Hong Kong branch campus, which is its first campus in Asia and will be in addition to campuses in Savannah, GA, Atlanta, GA and Lacoste, France. The anticipated renovation period for the magistracy building will be around 15 months and the SCAD school is expected to open in 2011, allowing the public to visit the old law courts and passages for prisoners. The estimated flow of people is about 130,000 headcounts per year for the first five years of opening.

Implementation
A branch campus of the Savannah College of Art and Design (SCAD) was established, providing 1,500 student places at tertiary level for studies on digital media, including animation, advertising design, photography, graphic design, illustration, interactive design and game development, motion media design, and visual effects. The revitalisation and reconstruction project was estimated to cost approximately $100 million. SCAD wishes to:

 Establish Hong Kong as a pre-eminent site for the study of digital media in Asia;
 Offer globally recognised digital media programmes, enhance global competitiveness in digital media and creative industries and increase educational diversity to Hong Kong;
 Give more support to the development of creative industry in Hong Kong;
 Set up a facility to provide cultural resources to both students and the professional industry; and
 Add an international dimension to the Sham Shui Po district and revitalize the community.

Apart from the above, it is hoped that the project will obtain synergy effect by cooperating with the nearby Jockey Club Creative Arts Centre and provide summer art programmes and campaigns to students.

The project retains the exterior appearance of the Magistracy. Parts of the building will remain open to the public and a gallery will be set up to display the history of the Magistracy. A website will also be created to show the comparison between the old Magistracy building and the newly renovated SCAD-Hong Kong Campus. A conservation documentary that captures the entire conservation process will be produced.

It is expected that the project will house 40 classrooms, 16 faculty and staff offices, one library, one art gallery, and two computer laboratories. Also, two court rooms will be converted into a digital studio and a lecture hall respectively. The project will implement a variety of greening measures such as use of high efficiency lighting and fixtures fabricated from sustainable materials.

Controversy over revitalisation scheme

Much controversy had arisen in the bidding process of the Scheme. Cantonese opera 'big sister' Liza Wang Ming-Chun who led the Chinese Artist Association of Hong Kong had submitted a proposal of renovating the Magistracy into a Cantonese opera training and performance centre. Immediately before the announcement of the result, Wang claimed that her association's plan would be rejected and the outcome was already 'fixed'. Wang's outburst has caused much public outcry and as a result the chairman of the Advisory Committee on Revitalization of Historic Buildings, Bernard Charnwut Chan, had to clean up the rumours on air.

On 17 February 2009, Liza Wang strongly protested against the result of the scheme, said she wanted to cry and threatened to take the matter up with Chief Executive Donald Tsang. The emotional outburst had drawn a big audience from the public and the incident was reported in the media for days. It was later reported in the newspapers that the association's initial proposal had a comparable score to the ultimate winner SCAD but fell short at the interview stage because Wang was unable to convince the Advisory Committee with an estimated operating cost of $15 million and foreseeable difficulty in raising funds.

Other places in the surroundings
 The nearest historic building is Mei Ho House (Grade I) of the old Shek Kip Mei Housing Estate
 Fook Tak Kwu Miu, 'Happiness and Virtue Ancient Temple'
 Saviour Lutheran School, a special school
 Hong Kong Sze Yap Commercial and Industrial Association School, a primary school

References

External links

 SCAD official website
 Presentation by SCAD Foundation (Hong Kong) Limited on 17 Feb 2009

Judiciary of Hong Kong
Government buildings in Hong Kong
Shek Kip Mei
Government buildings completed in 1960
1960 establishments in Hong Kong